Shoal Lake is a lake that straddles the boundary between Ontario and Manitoba, Canada, northwest of Lake of the Woods.  Depending on the water level of Lake of the Woods, Shoal Lake runs both into and out of Lake of the Woods and, for many practical purposes, is part of that lake.

Overview
It is a body of water that is not completely charted, and caution must be taken when navigating this body of water.  Smallmouth bass, northern pike and walleye are its primary species of fish.  At one time, it was a commercial fishery for walleye, but this was closed due to over fishing.

There are a number of private cabins in this area, and several commercial fishing lodges and resorts which offer housekeeping cabins and American-plan packages for tourists.  Shoal Lake is also home to Manitoba Pioneer Camp.

Two Ojibwe First Nations reserves lay claim to much of Shoal Lake.  They are bands #39 and #40.

The lake has a history of gold mining and as gold prices rise so does the pressure to explore mining on the lake again.  This pressure is being fought by local cottagers and the City of Winnipeg, which has used the lake as its main source of safe drinking water for almost 100 years.  Shoal Lake falls under special and specific developmental guidelines in order to protect its water quality and unique wildlife.

The City of Winnipeg operates the Greater Winnipeg Water District Railway between Shoal Lake and the City of Winnipeg.  The railway provides access by maintenance staff to the Greater Winnipeg Water District Aqueduct that is used to supply Winnipeg.

See also
List of lakes in Ontario

References

Lakes of Kenora District
Hudson's Bay Company trading posts